Halsuanjoki is a tributary river of Perhonjoki in Finland. Its source is Halsuanjärvi. There are several rapids in this river.

See also
Halsua
List of rivers of Finland

References

Halsua
Rivers of Finland